Angus Wright may refer to:

 Angus Wright (academic), environmental studies professor at California State University, Sacramento
 Angus Wright (actor) (born 1964), British actor
 Angus Wright (producer) (1934–2012), British television producer